Edoardo Mascheroni (born Milan, 4 September 1852 – died Valganna, 4 March 1941) was an Italian composer and conductor.  He is remembered for conducting the world premiere of Giuseppe Verdi's Falstaff; he also composed two operas of his own, to libretti by Luigi Illica.  His brother Angelo was also a composer.

Sources

His operas at italianopera.org

Italian classical composers
Italian male classical composers
Italian conductors (music)
Italian male conductors (music)
Italian opera composers
Male opera composers
Musicians from Milan
1852 births
1941 deaths